Peter Shotton (4 August 1941 – 24 March 2017) was an English businessman and former washboard player. He is known for his long friendship with John Lennon of The Beatles. He was a member of The Quarrymen, the precursor of the Beatles, and remained close to the group during their career.

His main career was as a restaurant manager, eventually founding the Fatty Arbuckle's chain of restaurants.

Early links with John Lennon
Shotton, born in Liverpool to George and Bessie (née Wilson) Shotton, was a close childhood friend of John Lennon, and attended Dovedale Infants School and Quarry Bank Grammar School at the same time as the future Beatle. The two boys were frequently in trouble with their teachers and with their headmasters, often being caned by the headmaster as punishment for their misdeeds, and they came to be known at Quarry Bank as "Shennon and Lotton" or "Lotton and Shennon."

In 1957, Shotton was Lennon's bandmate in The Quarrymen, playing a washboard, until Paul McCartney joined. Shotton was "fired" from the band when, after confiding that he really did not enjoy playing, Lennon smashed the washboard over his head at a party. However, he remained a friend and confidant – as he became friends with all of the Beatles during the group's forming.

Business career

After the Beatles became famous and wealthy, Lennon and George Harrison bought a supermarket on Hayling Island, and gave it to Shotton to run. Later, Shotton served as manager of the Apple Boutique, then as the first managing director of Apple Corps.

After Lennon began a relationship with Yoko Ono and Apple started to flounder, Shotton parted company with Lennon and the Beatles. He resumed his ownership of the Hayling Island supermarket, which he continued to run until the late 1970s. He then began the Fatty Arbuckle's chain of restaurants, a franchise designed to bring the feel of the American diner to Britain. The franchise was highly successful in the 1980s and was later sold for an undisclosed sum. He later moved to Dublin, Ireland, living as a tax exile.

Upon hearing the news that Lennon had been murdered on 8 December 1980, Shotton visited Harrison at Friar Park, Harrison's home.

Shotton is the co-author, with Nicholas Schaffner, of John Lennon: In My Life (1983, republished later as The Beatles, Lennon and Me), which told the story of their friendship, from the age of six until Lennon's death.

Death
Shotton died of a heart attack  on 24 March 2017 at his home in Knutsford, Cheshire.

References
Notes

Bibliography
Shotton, Pete & Schaffner, Nicholas. John Lennon: In My Life (1983).  
Davies, Hunter. The Quarrymen (2001), Omnibus. 
Norman, Philip (2008). John Lennon: The Life. HarperCollins. .

External links 
 Quarry Men
 Hunter Davies talks to Shotton.

1941 births
2017 deaths
Apple Corps
The Quarrymen members
People educated at Quarry Bank High School
Businesspeople from Liverpool
The Beatles
English expatriates in Ireland
Washboard players
20th-century English businesspeople